Deutsche Physik ("German Physics") or Aryan Physics  was a nationalist movement in the German physics community in the early 1930s which had the support of many eminent physicists in Germany. The term was taken from the title of a four-volume physics textbook by Nobel laureate Philipp Lenard in the 1930s.

Deutsche Physik was opposed to the work of Albert Einstein and other modern theoretically based physics, which was disparagingly labeled "Jewish physics".

Origins

This movement began as an extension of a German nationalistic movement in the physics community which went back as far as World War I. On 25 August 1914, during the German invasion of Belgium, German troops used petrol to set fire to the library of the Katholieke Universiteit Leuven. The burning of the library led to a protest note which was signed by eight distinguished British scientists, namely William Bragg, William Crookes, Alexander Fleming, Horace Lamb, Oliver Lodge, William Ramsay, Lord Rayleigh, and J. J. Thomson. In 1915, this led to a counter-reaction in the form of an "appeal" formulated by Wilhelm Wien and addressed to German physicists and scientific publishers, which was signed by sixteen German physicists, including Arnold Sommerfeld and Johannes Stark. They claimed that German character had been misinterpreted and that attempts made over many years to reach an understanding between the two countries had obviously failed. Therefore, they opposed the use of the English language by German scientific authors, editors of books, and translators. A number of German physicists, including Max Planck and the especially passionate Philipp Lenard, a scientific rival of J. J. Thomson,  had then signed further "declarations", so that gradually a "war of the minds" broke out. On the German side it  was suggested to avoid an unnecessary use of English language in scientific texts (concerning, e.g., the renaming of German-discovered phenomena with perceived English-derived names, such as "X-ray" instead of "Röntgen ray"). It was stressed, however,  that this measure should not be misunderstood as a rejection of British scientific thought, ideas and stimulations.

After the war, the perceived affronts of the Treaty of Versailles kept some of these nationalistic feelings running high, especially in Lenard, who had already complained about England in a small pamphlet at the beginning of the war. When, on 26 January 1920, the former naval cadet Oltwig von Hirschfeld tried to assassinate German Finance minister Matthias Erzberger, Lenard sent Hirschfeld a telegram of congratulation. After the 1922 assassination of politician Walther Rathenau, the government ordered flags flown at half mast on the day of his funeral, but Lenard ignored the order at his institute in Heidelberg. Socialist students organized a demonstration against Lenard, who was taken into protective custody by state prosecutor Hugo Marx. The sentiment displayed by Lenard was not unique to physics or physicists; the blend of nationalism and perceived affront from foreign and internal forces was a key reason for the popularity of the rising Nazi Party in the 1920s.

During the early years of the twentieth century, Albert Einstein's Theory of Relativity caused bitter controversy within the worldwide physics community. There were many physicists, especially the "old guard", who were suspicious of the intuitive meanings of Einstein's theories. While the response to Einstein was based in part on his concepts being a radical break from earlier theories, there was also an anti-Jewish element to some of the criticism. The leading theoretician of the Deutsche Physik type of movement  was Rudolf Tomaschek, who had re-edited the famous physics textbook Grimsehl's Lehrbuch der Physik. In that book, which consists of several volumes, the Lorentz transformation was accepted, as well as quantum theory. However, Einstein's interpretation of the Lorentz transformation was not mentioned, and Einstein's name was completely ignored. Many classical physicists resented Einstein's dismissal of the notion of a luminiferous aether, which had been a mainstay of their work for the majority of their productive lives. They were not convinced by the empirical evidence for relativity. They believed that the measurements of the perihelion of Mercury and the null result of the Michelson–Morley experiment might be explained in other ways, and the results of the Eddington eclipse experiment were experimentally problematic enough to be dismissed as meaningless by the more devoted doubters. Many of them were very distinguished experimental physicists, and Lenard was himself a Nobel laureate in physics.

Under the Third Reich

When the Nazis entered the political scene, Lenard quickly attempted to ally himself with them, joining the party at an early stage. With another physics Nobel laureate, Johannes Stark, Lenard began a core campaign to label Einstein's Relativity as Jewish Physics.

Lenard<ref>Philipp Lenard: Ideelle Kontinentalsperre, München 1940.</ref> and Stark benefited considerably from this Nazi support. Under the rallying cry that physics should be more "German" and "Aryan," Lenard and Stark embarked on a Nazi-endorsed plan to replace physicists at German universities with "Aryan Physicists". By 1935, though, this campaign was superseded by the Nuremberg Laws of 1935.  There were no longer any Jewish physics professors in Germany, since under the Nuremberg Laws, Jews were not allowed to work in universities. Stark in particular also tried to install himself as the national authority on "German" physics under the principle of  Gleichschaltung (literally, "coordination") applied to other professional disciplines. Under this Nazi-era paradigm, academic disciplines and professional fields followed a strictly linear hierarchy created along ideological lines.

The figureheads of "Aryan Physics" met with moderate success, but the support from the Nazi Party was not as great as Lenard and Stark would have preferred. After a long period of harassment of quantum physicist Werner Heisenberg, including getting him labeled a "White Jew" in Das Schwarze Korps, they began to fall from influence. Heisenberg was a pre-eminent physicist whom the Nazis realized they were better off with than without, however "Jewish" his theory might be in the eyes of Stark and Lenard. In a historic moment, Heisenberg's mother rang Himmler's mother and asked her if she would please tell the SS to give "Werner" a break. After beginning a full character evaluation, which Heisenberg both instigated and passed, Himmler forbade further attack on the physicist. Heisenberg would later employ his "Jewish physics" in the German project to develop nuclear fission for the purposes of nuclear weapons or nuclear energy use.  Himmler promised Heisenberg that after Germany won the war, the SS would finance a physics institute to be directed by Heisenberg.

Lenard began to play less and less of a role, and soon Stark ran into even more difficulty, as other scientists and industrialists known for being exceptionally "Aryan" came to the defense of Relativity and quantum mechanics. As historian Mark Walker puts it, "despite his best efforts, in the end his science was not accepted, supported, or used by the Third Reich. Stark spent a great deal of his time during the Third Reich fighting with bureaucrats within the National Socialist state. Most of the National Socialist leadership either never supported Lenard and Stark, or abandoned them in the course of the Third Reich."

Effect on the German nuclear program
It is occasionally put forth that there is a great irony in the Nazis' labeling modern physics as "Jewish science", since it was exactly modern physics—and the work of many European exiles—which was used to create the atomic bomb.  Even if the German government had not embraced Lenard and Stark's ideas, the German antisemitic agenda was enough by itself to destroy the Jewish scientific community in Germany. Furthermore, the German nuclear weapons program was never pursued with anywhere near the vigor of the Manhattan Project in the United States, and for that reason would likely not have succeeded in any case.  The movement did not actually go as far as preventing the nuclear energy scientists from using quantum mechanics and relativity, but the education of young scientists and engineers suffered, not only from the loss of the Jewish scientists but also from political appointments and other interference.

See also
 Ahnenerbe (Nazi archaeology)
 Criticism of the theory of relativity
 Deutsche Mathematik Japhetic theory
 Lysenkoism
 Politicization of science
 Suppressed research in the Soviet Union
 Wilhelm Müller (physicist)

References

 Further literature 
 Ball, Philip, Serving the Reich: The Struggle for the Soul of Physics Under Hitler (University of Chicago Press, 2014).
 Beyerchen, Alan, Scientists under Hitler: Politics and the physics community in the Third Reich (New Haven, CT: Yale University Press, 1977).
 Hentschel, Klaus, ed. Physics and National Socialism: An anthology of primary sources (Basel: Birkhaeuser, 1996).
 Philipp Lenard: Wissenschaftliche Abhandlungen Band IV. Herausgegeben und kritisch kommentiert von Charlotte Schönbeck. [Posthumously, German Language.] Berlin: GNT-Verlag, 2003. . Introduction, Content.
 Walker, Mark, Nazi science: Myth, truth, and the German atomic bomb'' (New York: Harper Collins, 1995).

External links 
 

Anti-intellectualism
History of physics
Politics of science
Pseudoscience
Relativity critics
Science in Nazi Germany